The Viking 5 was a car and passenger ferry delivered to Rederi Ab Sally for use in Viking Line traffic between Helsinki, Finland and Stockholm, Sweden. She operated this route in Viking Line colours between 1974 and 1980.

The Viking 5 was later known by the names The Viking, Sally Express, Bolette and Boughaz. The ship was laid up in 2011 and sold for scrap in Aliağa, Turkey in 2015.

References

Ferries of Finland
Ships built in Papenburg
1974 ships